Binding and loosing is originally a Jewish Mishnaic phrase also mentioned in the  New Testament, as well as in the Targum. In usage, to bind and to loose simply means to forbid by an indisputable authority and to permit by an indisputable authority. One example of this is Isaiah 58:5–6 which relates proper fasting to loosing the chains of injustice.

The poseks had, by virtue of their ordination, the power of deciding disputes relating to Jewish law. Hence, the difference between the two main schools of thought in early classical Judaism were summed up by the phrase the school of Shammai binds; the school of Hillel looses. Theoretically, however, the authority of the poseks proceeded from the Sanhedrin, and there is therefore a Talmudic statement that there were three decisions made by the lower house of judgment (the Sanhedrin) to which the upper house of judgment (the heavenly one) gave its supreme sanction. The claim that whatsoever [a disciple] bind[s] or loose[s] on earth shall be bound or loosed in heaven, which the Gospel of Matthew attributes to Jesus, and is still used commonly today in prayer, an effective method on account to Christianity.

This is also the meaning of the phrase when it is applied in the text to Simon Peter and the other apostles in particular when they are invested with the power to bind and loose by Christ.

This also serves as the scriptural and traditional foundation for the Catholic Church's conception of papal authority, stemming from such an investiture of St. Peter, since, according to Catholic doctrine, the Popes are the Successors of St. Peter.

References

External links 
Jewish Encyclopedia: Binding and Loosing
Catholic Encyclopedia: The Pope: "The expressions binding and loosing here employed are derived from the current terminology of the Rabbinic schools. A doctor  who declared a thing to be prohibited by the law was said to bind, for thereby he imposed an obligation on the conscience. He who declared it to be lawful was said to loose."

Targums
Christian terminology
Sayings of Jesus
Biblical phrases